Parapsestis albida is a moth in the family Drepanidae. It was described by Suzuki in 1916. It is found in Japan and China (Shaanxi, Gansu). The Global Lepidoptera Names Index gives this name as a synonym of Parapsestis umbrosa.

References

Moths described in 1916
Thyatirinae
Moths of Asia